Venefica tentaculata is an eel in the family Nettastomatidae (duckbill/witch eels). It was described by Samuel Garman in 1899. It is a marine, subtropical eel which is known from the eastern central and northwestern Pacific Ocean, including Mexico, Nicaragua, Japan, and the United States.

Due to the relatively wide distribution of this species, and the estimated unlikelihood of major threats, due to its deep water habitat, the IUCN redlist currently lists V. tentaculata as Least Concern.

References

Nettastomatidae
Fish described in 1899